WSRE (channel 23) is a PBS member television station in Pensacola, Florida, United States, owned by Pensacola State College (PSC). The station's studios are located at the Kugelman Center for Telecommunications on the Pensacola State main campus, and its transmitter is located near Robertsdale, Alabama.

Production facilities
WSRE is licensed to the Board of Trustees of Pensacola State College (PSC), and operates as a department of the college affiliated with the Public Broadcasting Service (PBS). A foundation established in 1990 administers its finances.

WSRE's studios are located at the Kugelman Center for Telecommunications at PSC's main campus in Pensacola. There are several studios. The Jean & Paul Amos Performance Studio is a fully featured  television soundstage offering stadium-style seating, which is retractable to allow for more soundstage space. Studio B provides the same technical capabilities but with moderate floor space not designed for a live audience. Most of the station's local programming is produced in Studio B. Studio C is a smaller studio which is almost exclusively used for television programs and segments designed for satellite uplinks. MSNBC's Scarborough Country (now known as Morning Joe) was often produced in Studio C when former representative Joe Scarborough was in Pensacola.

Local programming

The station produces many local and regional programs, including:

Open Forum – a call-in talk show
Connecting the Community – a weekly call-in program of local community events
Garden Magic – a call-in gardening program hosted by Bill Bennett
Food for Thought – features speeches by visiting experts
Aware! – a local show on issues affecting community members
Rally – a political debate program that aired before local elections
Pensacola State Today – local news program
Legislative Review – panel show with state legislators
Flavors of the Coast – cooking program featuring local Gulf Coast recipes

Gourmet Cooking
WSRE was the home of the nationally televised French cooking program, Gourmet Cooking, which was hosted by Earl Peyroux. It began as a local program in 1977, and was syndicated on national public television from 1982 to the early 1990s.

WLNE
WLNE was a local educational-access television channel operated by WSRE and targeted towards young children and teachers. The channel's "callsign" was the acronym "Where Learning Never Ends". The channel was only available on Cox Cable channel 19 in Pensacola. (This WLNE should not be confused with the ABC affiliate in New Bedford, Massachusetts, which holds the callsign "WLNE-TV".)

WSRE discontinued WLNE on September 30, 2008, because the Annenberg Foundation discontinued its satellite service (from which most of WLNE's education programming originated).

Technical information

Subchannels
The station's digital signal is multiplexed:

Analog-to-digital conversion
WSRE discontinued regular programming on its analog signal, over UHF channel 23, on February 17, 2009, in compliance with the transition from analog to digital broadcasts in the United States. The station's digital signal remained on its pre-transition UHF channel 31. Through the use of PSIP, digital television receivers display the station's virtual channel as channel 23.

The analog close-down was marked with a special retrospective, featuring portions of the previous WSRE sign-offs and sign-ons, an explanation of sign-offs, vintage studio photos and a final farewell; the special was broadcast on both analog and digital signals. After the analog signal closed, the digital transmission (broadcasting from a facility shared with other stations in Robertsdale) went to color bars and signed back on a couple of hours later.

WSRE's analog signal had operated from a transmitter on Fairfield Drive in Pensacola. In 2006, it activated its full-power digital transmitter in Robertsdale, Alabama. Recently, the station has begun branding itself as a full-market PBS station, challenging Alabama Public Television's Mobile outlet, WEIQ (which broadcasts from facilities closer to Mobile in Spanish Fort).

References

External links
 

SRE
PBS member stations
Television channels and stations established in 1967
1967 establishments in Florida